Walter Heinzl is a bobsledder who competed for Czechoslovakia in the mid-1930s. He finished 12th in the four-man event at the 1936 Winter Olympics in Garmisch-Partenkirchen.

References
 1936 bobsleigh four-man results
 1936 Olympic Winter Games official report - p. 415.
 Walter Heinzl's profile at Sports Reference.com

External links
 

Olympic bobsledders of Czechoslovakia
Bobsledders at the 1936 Winter Olympics
Czechoslovak male bobsledders
German Bohemian people
Possibly living people
Year of birth missing
Czechoslovak people of German descent